Rick Meyers (born May 14, 1958) is an American former professional tennis player.

Born and raised in Abilene, Texas, Meyers won a 5A state singles championship while at Cooper High School and played collegiate tennis for Texas Christian University, where he was named All-Southwest Conference all four years.

Meyers was a main draw qualifier for the 1981 Canadian Open and fell in the first round to the sixth-seeded player Eliot Teltscher. He also made a Grand Prix tournament appearance at the Caracas Open in 1982 and was eliminated in the second round by Eddie Dibbs, after a win over Roberto Vizcaíno.

In 2008 he was inducted into the Texas Tennis Hall of Fame.

References

External links
 
 

1958 births
Living people
American male tennis players
TCU Horned Frogs men's tennis players
Tennis people from Texas
Sportspeople from Abilene, Texas